Luguaedon of Inchagoill (also Lugnad, Lugnaedon) was an Irish hermit.

Luguaedon is known from a remarkable upright, decorated cross-slab stone on the island of Inchagoill, Lough Corrib, County Galway. It reads "LIE LUGUAEDON MACCI MENUEH" ('the stone of Luguaedon son of Menueh'), which may be a transliteration of an older Ogham inscription.

Luguaedon's origins are obscure, and may have been quite early in the early Irish Christian era. Traditions recorded in the late 19th and early 20th centuries states that Luguaedon had been British (Britons (historical)) – the name of the island means "the stranger's island." He is also said in local folklore to have been St. Patrick’s nephew and navigator.

Though the usual reading of the name is "Luguaedon Macci Menueh", Damian McManus posits that it may be an earlier form, "moccu", which denoted a relationship or kinship to a tribe, rather than a dynastic blood relationship (see Irish name).

The stone is 1 metre tall and stands among the other stones surrounding the church.

External links
 http://www.megalithicireland.com/Inchagoill%20Island.htm
 https://web.archive.org/web/20110607123531/http://www.letsgo.com/17377-ireland-travel-guides-western_ireland-lough_corrib-oughterard_uachtar_%C3%81rd-c
 http://gray.ischool.berkeley.edu:1935/0314/raw_text/00400_00010_mon_00023.txt
 http://publish.ucc.ie/doi/locus/I

References

 The Stone of Luguaedon on Inchagoill, the Editor, Vol. 3, part ii, Journal of the Galway Archaeological and Historical Society, 1903–1904
 A Guide to Ogham, Damian McManus, Maynooth, 1991.

People from County Galway
Sub-Roman Britons
6th-century Irish people
Navigators